James Bartley (1870–1909) is the central figure in a late nineteenth-century story according to which he was swallowed whole by a sperm whale. He was found still living days later in the stomach of the whale, which was dead from harpooning.

The story originated of an anonymous form, began to appear in American newspapers.  The anonymous article appeared in the St. Louis Globe Democrat of Saint Louis, Missouri, then the note appeared in other newspapers with the title "A Modern Jonah" or something similar in multiple newspapers.

The news spread beyond the ocean in articles as "Man in a Whale's Stomach.  "Rescue of a Modern Jonah" in page 8 of the August 22, 1891, issue of the Yarmouth Mercury newspaper of Great Yarmouth in England.

Story
The story, as reported, is that during a whaling expedition off the Falkland Islands, Bartley's boat was attacked by the whale and he landed inside the whale's mouth. He survived the ordeal and was carved out of the stomach by his peers when they, not knowing he was inside, caught and began skinning the whale, because the hot weather otherwise would have rotted the whale meat. It was said that Bartley was inside the whale for 36 hours, that his skin had been bleached by the gastric juices, and that he was blind the rest of his life. In some accounts, however, he was supposed to have returned to work within three weeks. He died 18 years later and his tombstone in Gloucester says "James Bartley – a modern day Jonah."

In 1896, an article titled "A Modern Jonah Proves his Story" was published in the New York World; it quoted a brief portion of this story, as told by Rev. William Justin Harsha, along with some initial observations. This was followed about a week later by another article that briefly summarised some responses from readers, followed by a third article by William L. Stone, who related a similar story involving a massive "man-eating shark".

The French scientist De Parville published a report of the alleged incident in the Paris Journal des Débats in 1914.

Investigations
More recently, the facts were carefully investigated by historian Edward B. Davis, who pointed out many inconsistencies. The ship in the story is The Star of the East. While a British ship by the same name existed and sailed during the time in which the incident allegedly occurred and could have been near the Falklands at the right time, the relevant Star of the East was not a whaling vessel and its crew list did not include a James Bartley. Moreover, Mrs. John Killam, the wife of the Captain, wrote a letter stating that "there is not one word of truth in the whale story. I was with my husband all the years he was in the Star of the East. There was never a man lost overboard while my husband was in her. The sailor has told a great sea yarn." Davis suggested that the story may have been inspired by the "Gorleston whale", a  rorqual killed near Great Yarmouth shortly before in June 1891 that generated a lot of publicity.

While the veracity of the story is in question, it is physically possible for a sperm whale to swallow a human whole, as they are known to swallow giant squid whole. However, such a person would be crushed, drowned or suffocated in the whale's stomach. Like ruminants, the sperm whale has a four-chambered stomach. The first secretes no gastric juices and has very thick muscular walls to crush the food (since whales cannot chew) and resist the claw and sucker attacks of swallowed squid. The second chamber is larger and is where digestion takes place.

Cultural references
George Orwell refers to this incident (twice) in his 1939 novel Coming Up for Air (though not in his 1940 essay "Inside the Whale"). Julian Barnes references the event in his novel A History of the World in 10½ Chapters, as did Arthur C. Clarke's novel Childhood's End and J. M. Ledgard in his novel Submergence, the latter albeit using a different name, John More, for the swallowed victim. Clive Cussler also refers to the James Bartley story in his novel Medusa. James Bartley was also mentioned in the 1965 "Jonah and the Whale" episode of the Voyage to the Bottom of the Sea television series.

See also 
 Jonah

References 

 The research about newspapers as "A Modern Jonah" The Wheeling Daily Intelligencer, July 2, 1891, from Wheeling, W. Va.; "The Modern Mr. Jonah" The Helena Independent, July 14, 1891, Helena, Mont., "A Real Living Jonah" Wood County Reporter, July 30, 1891, Grand Rapids, Wis., (U.S.A), and the correction of the article published in the New York World (April 12, 1896) by Jose Castaneda.

External links 
 The complete story of James Bartley
 Truth-Or-Fiction Article on James Bartley
 Trivia-Library.com
 Edward T. Babinski, Bachelor of Science, Biology and his research into the James Bartley story
 "Have any real-life Jonahs been swallowed by whales and lived?" from The Straight Dope, September 14, 2001

1870 births
1909 deaths
Urban legends
History of the Falkland Islands